A Town of Love and Hope, also titled Street of Love and Hope, is a 1959 Japanese drama film written and directed by Nagisa Ōshima. It was Ōshima's feature film debut.

Plot
Masao lives with his mother, who works as a shoe polisher, and his sister in a poverty-stricken era of Tokyo. He earns extra money for the family by repeatedly selling his sister's pigeons to passersby in the city, knowing the pigeons will escape their new owners and return home after a few days. The latest buyer, upper-class girl Kyōko, unites with Masao's teacher Miss Akiyama in an act of sympathy to help Masao get a job in the company of Kyōko's father Kuhara. Kuhara first declines, but Kyōko's brother Yuji, who has developed an interest in Miss Akiyama, tries to talk him into giving Masao a chance. Yet, when Kyōko and Miss Akiyama find out that Masao's fraud was not a single but a repeated one, both turn away from him in disappointment. Breaking all ties in a final vengeful act, Kyōko once again purchases a pigeon from Masao and has her brother shoot it with his rifle.

Cast
 Hiroshi Fujikawa as Masao
 Yuki Tominaga as Kyōko
 Kakuko Chino as Miss Akiyama, Masao's teacher
 Yūko Mochizuki as Kuniko, Masao's mother
 Fumio Watanabe as Yuji, Kyōko's brother
 Fujio Suga as Kuhara, Kyōko's father
 Michiko Ito as Yasue, Masao's sister
 Noboru Sakashita as Taizō
 Toyoko Uryū as Isako

Production
Due to the "new wave policy" of Shochiku studio's head Shirō Kido, designed to promote fresh and free films, Ōshima was given the opportunity to write and direct his first feature film with the production title The Boy Who Sold His Pigeon. Kido, unsatisfied with the result and calling it a "tendency picture", only gave it limited distribution under the title A Town of Love and Hope. Still, reviews for the film were positive. More recent reviewers have pointed out the difference of A Town of Love and Hope both to other Japanese filmmakers of its era and Italian neorealism lying in its refusal to inject humanism or humanist sentiment into its portrayal of class opposition.

References

External links
 

1959 films
1959 drama films
Japanese drama films
1959 directorial debut films
Films directed by Nagisa Ōshima
1950s Japanese films